Workin' with the Miles Davis Quintet is a studio album by the Miles Davis quintet recorded in 1956 and released circa January 1960. Two sessions on May 11, 1956, and October 26 in the same year resulted in four albums—this one, Relaxin' with the Miles Davis Quintet, Steamin' with the Miles Davis Quintet and Cookin' with the Miles Davis Quintet.

Track 2 is a composition written for Davis by Eddie Vinson (see Blue Haze for more details). "Trane's Blues" (also known as "Vierd Blues", a tongue-in-cheek reference to Blue Note founder Francis Wolff's heavily accented verdict on it), also credited to Davis, is in fact a John Coltrane composition (originally titled "John Paul Jones", and from an earlier session led by bassist Paul Chambers; before the closing statement of theme, Coltrane and Davis play a bit of Charlie Parker's "The Hymn").

Background 
As his star rose in 1955, Davis formed a new quintet, featuring saxophonist John Coltrane, pianist Red Garland, bassist Paul Chambers, and drummer Philly Joe Jones. In order to fulfill contractual obligations, he recorded lengthy, spontaneous songs with the quintet, which were released over four albums—Workin, Cookin', Relaxin', and Steamin' with the Miles Davis Quintet.

Track listing
Prestige – LP 7166:

All tracks recorded on May 11, 1956, except "Half Nelson", recorded on October 26.

Personnel
Miles Davis – trumpet
John Coltrane – tenor saxophone (except 1)
Red Garland – piano
Paul Chambers – bass, cello
Philly Joe Jones – drums

References

1960 albums
Miles Davis albums
Prestige Records albums
Albums produced by Bob Weinstock
Albums recorded at Van Gelder Studio